Conroy Wright (born 18 April 1985) is a Caymanian cricketer.  Wright is a right-handed batsman who bowls right-arm medium pace.

Wright made his debut for the Cayman Islands in a Twenty20 match against the Bahamas in the 2006 Stanford 20/20.  He made a further appearance in that competition, against Trinidad and Tobago.  He later made a further Twenty20 appearance in the 2008 Stanford 20/20 against St Lucia.  He batted just once in his three Twenty20 appearances, being dismissed for a duck against Trinidad and Tobago by Samuel Badree.  He also took just a single wicket, that of St Lucia's Shervin Charles.

He has since played for the team in the 2010 Americas Championship Division One and the 2010 World Cricket League Division Four.  He was selected as part of the Cayman Islands squad for the 2012 World Cricket League Division Five played in Singapore in February.

In August 2019, he was named in the Cayman Islands cricket team's Twenty20 International (T20I) squad for the Regional Finals of the 2018–19 ICC T20 World Cup Americas Qualifier tournament. He made his T20I debut for the Cayman Islands against Canada on 18 August 2019.

References

External links
Conroy Wright at ESPNcricinfo
Conroy Wright at CricketArchive

1985 births
Living people
Caymanian cricketers
Cayman Islands Twenty20 International cricketers